Esteban Flores (born 8 August 1967) is a Puerto Rican boxer. He competed in the men's featherweight event at the 1988 Summer Olympics.

References

External links
 

1967 births
Living people
Puerto Rican male boxers
Olympic boxers of Puerto Rico
Boxers at the 1988 Summer Olympics
Place of birth missing (living people)
Pan American Games medalists in boxing
Pan American Games bronze medalists for Puerto Rico
Boxers at the 1987 Pan American Games
Featherweight boxers
Medalists at the 1987 Pan American Games